Java Agent Template (JAT), is a fully functional Java template, for building software agents that can communicate in a P2P distributed network over the Internet.

See also

References

External links
http://www-cdr.stanford.edu/ABE/documentation/overview.html
http://www-cdr.stanford.edu/ABE/JavaAgent.html

Java programming language family
Java development tools